Liwa al-Haqq (meaning "Right Brigade") was an armed Islamist insurgent group that was active during the Syrian Civil War in the Homs region. 

On 11 August 2012, a group of Islamist-leaning brigades in Homs formed Liwa al-Haqq, which went on to become in the next year one of the most prominent fighting groups in the area. Important sub-units include Katibat al-Furati, Kataeb Atbaa al-Rasoul and Katibat al-Ansar.

In December 2012, Liwa al-Haqq joined with other insurgent groups to form the Syrian Islamic Front umbrella organization, in November 2013 the SIF was dissolved and Liwa al-Haqq, Ansar al-Sham and Ahrar al-Sham joined the broader Islamic Front alliance.

By April 2014, Liwa al-Haqq had reportedly been weakened in the wake of advances made by the Syrian military in the Homs region, and it merged with Ahrar al-Sham in December 2014.

See also
 List of armed groups in the Syrian Civil War

References

External links
  

Anti-government factions of the Syrian civil war